is a former Japanese football player. She played for Japan national team.

Club career
Toyoda was born in Kamakura on September 15, 1986. She was promoted to Nippon TV Beleza from youth team in 2003. She retired in June 2011. In 2012, she came back at Speranza FC Osaka-Takatsuki. In October, she moved to Albirex Niigata. From 2013, she played for Bunnys Kyoto SC (2013) and Yokohama FC Seagulls (2014).

National team career
On December 18, 2004, when Toyoda was 18 years old, she debuted for Japan national team against Chinese Taipei. She was a member of Japan for 2007 World Cup. She played 22 games for Japan until 2010.

National team statistics

References

External links
 

1986 births
Living people
Hosei University alumni
People from Kamakura
Association football people from Kanagawa Prefecture
Japanese women's footballers
Japan women's international footballers
Nadeshiko League players
Nippon TV Tokyo Verdy Beleza players
Speranza Osaka-Takatsuki players
Albirex Niigata Ladies players
Bunnys Kyoto SC players
Nippatsu Yokohama FC Seagulls players
2007 FIFA Women's World Cup players
Women's association football defenders